Ivan Arvel Elliott, Sr. (November 18, 1889 – April 13, 1990) was an American lawyer.

Born in White County, Illinois, Elliott received his bachelor's degree from University of Illinois and his law degree from Illinois Wesleyan University. He served in the United States Army during World War I and World War II. Elliott was a Democrat. He practiced law in Carmi, Illinois, served as the Carmi City Attorney and served as President of the Carmi School Board. From 1937 to 1942, Elliott served as State's Attorney of White County, Illinois. From 1949 to 1953, Elliott served as Illinois Attorney General. In 1952, he was defeated for re-election.

Notes

1889 births
1990 deaths
People from Carmi, Illinois
Illinois Wesleyan University alumni
University of Illinois alumni
Illinois lawyers
Illinois Democrats
School board members in Illinois
Illinois Attorneys General
American centenarians
Men centenarians
20th-century American politicians
20th-century American lawyers